Raise Hell is a Swedish thrash metal band from Stockholm, Sweden. The group changed names several times in their early history; their first demo, 1997's Nailed, was released under the name In Cold Blood, a name they abandoned for Raise Hell after signing with Nuclear Blast—which they did while still in their teens. After the album's release the group toured Europe with Dismember, Children of Bodom, and others. Their second album, Not Dead Yet, was released in 1999 and produced by Anders Fridén (of In Flames), and was followed by a tour with Destruction. After further touring and appearances at the Wacken Open Air festival, the group returned to the studio in 2002 for Wicked Is My Game. Guitarist Jonas von Wowern (Nilsson) did the vocals for the first three albums. In 2002 Jimmy Fjällendahl joined the band as vocalist, so Jonas could focus on playing guitar. The group signed with Black Lodge Records in 2004; City of the Damned followed in 2006, and another tour of Europe with Necrophobic and Origin Blood followed later that year.

Members
Current
Jonas von Wowern - guitar, vocals
Jimmy Fjällendahl - vocals (2002–present)
Joakim Kulo - guitar
Niklas Sjöström - bass
Dennis Ekdahl - drums

Former
Torsten Wickberg - guitar

Discography
Nailed (demo, 1997)
Holy Target (Nuclear Blast, 1998)
Not Dead Yet (Nuclear Blast, 2000)
Wicked Is My Game (Nuclear Blast, 2002)
City of the Damned (Black Lodge/Sound Pollution, 2006)
Written in Blood (Black Lodge, 2015)

References

Musical groups established in 1995
Swedish death metal musical groups
Swedish thrash metal musical groups
Nuclear Blast artists